Anoulack Chanthivong (born 20 July 1977) is an Australian politician who was elected to the New South Wales Legislative Assembly as the member for Macquarie Fields for the Labor Party at the 2015 New South Wales state election.

Chanthivong was born in Laos and grew up in Raby. He was a Campbelltown City Councillor and was mayor from 2011 to 2012. On 11 June 2021, Chanthivong was appointed to the Minns Shadow Ministry, under the portfolios of Finance, Industry & Trade.

References
 

1977 births
Living people
Laotian emigrants to Australia
Australian Labor Party members of the Parliament of New South Wales
Members of the New South Wales Legislative Assembly
University of Sydney alumni
Alumni of the London School of Economics
Place of birth missing (living people)
21st-century Australian politicians